A.B.M. Ruhul Amin Howlader (born 2 March 1953) is a Jatiya Party politician and a former Jatiya Sangsad member representing the Patuakhali-1 and Barisal-6 constituencies. Since 2020 he is serving as co-chairman of the Jatiya Party.

Early life
Howlader was born on 2 March 1953. He has a B.A. degree.

Career
Howlader was appointed the general secretary of Jatiya Party in 2001. He was elected to Parliament in 2008 from Barisal-6 as a Jatiya Party candidate. On 10 April 2013, he was removed from the post of general secretary following a power struggle in the party. He again was elected to Parliament in 2014 from Patuakhali-1. On 19 January 2016, he was reinstated to the post of secretary general.

Howlader served as the secretary general of Jatiya Party till 3 December 2018 when he was replaced by Mashiur Rahaman Ranga. Bangladesh Election Commission declared his candidacy from Patuakhali-1 for the 2018 Bangladesh General election void because he defaulted on a loan.

References

Living people
1953 births
Jatiya Party politicians
10th Jatiya Sangsad members
Place of birth missing (living people)